Kopidlno is a town in Jičín District in the Hradec Králové Region of the Czech Republic. It has about 2,100 inhabitants.

Administrative parts
Villages of Drahoraz, Mlýnec, Ledkov and Pševes are administrative parts of Kopidlno.

Etymology
The name Kopidlno is probably derived from the name of medicinal plants found in the surrounding forests (Asarum europaeum, colloquially known in Czech as kopidlen). According to other theories, it might be derived from the Old Czech kopjo dlinno (i.e. "long spear"), or from kopidlo ("hay stake").

Geography

It lies mostly in the Central Elbe Table, but the municipal territory also extends to the Jičín Uplands in the north and east. The town is situated on the Mrlina River. There are several ponds in the territory, the largest of them are Zrcadlo and Zámecký.

History
The first written mention of Kopidlno is from 1322. The first owners of Kopidlno were the Kopidlanský family. Among the next owners were many notable noble families, including Haugwitz, Trčka of Lípa, Thurn und Taxis and Schlick, and individuals Albrecht von Wallenstein and Ludwig of Dietrichstein. In 1514, Kopidlno was promoted to a town by King Vladislaus II. The most important owners of Kopidlno were the Schlick family. During their era, crafts and education developed in the town.

Demographics

Culture
The Czech bluegrass festival called Banjo Jamboree, founded in 1972 in Kopidlno, is the first and longest-running Bluegrass festival in Europe. In 1992, it was moved to Čáslav.

Sights

There are two notable historical buildings, a castle and a church. The Kopidlno Castle dates from the mid-16th century, when it replaced an old fortress. The current Neorenaissance appearance is a result of the reconstruction in the mid-19th century. Today it houses a horticulture school and is inaccessible.

The Church of Saint James the Great was built in the Baroque style in 1704–1705. It replaced a Gothic church, destroyed by fire in 1677.

In the village of Drahoraz there is the Church of Saints Peter and Paul. It is a Gothic building from the 15th century. In 1695–1698, the Chapel of the Holy Sepulchre was added to the church. The wooden bell tower next to the church dates from 1893.

Notable people
Joseph Anton Steffan (1726–1797), Austrian composer
Anna Honzáková (1875–1940), physician

References

External links

Cities and towns in the Czech Republic
Populated places in Jičín District